Curtis Vernon Wilkerson (born April 26, 1961), is an American former professional baseball player. He played in Major League Baseball as a utility player for the Texas Rangers, Chicago Cubs, Pittsburgh Pirates, and Kansas City Royals from -.

He was drafted in the fourth round of the 1980 Major League Baseball Draft by the Texas Rangers.

On December 5, 1988, he was traded by the Texas Rangers with Paul Kilgus, Mitch Williams, Steve Wilson, and minor leaguers Luis Benitez and Pablo Delgado to the Chicago Cubs for Rafael Palmeiro, Jamie Moyer, and Drew Hall. After two seasons with the Cubs, Wilkerson played with the Pittsburgh Pirates and the Kansas City Royals.

After ending his playing career, Wilkerson coached in the Royals and Pirates organizations. He was the manager of the Tarrant County Blue Thunder of the independent Continental Baseball League before the team folded after the 2008 season.

External links

1961 births
Living people
African-American baseball players
Chicago Cubs players
Texas Rangers players
Pittsburgh Pirates players
Kansas City Royals players
Major League Baseball shortstops
Major League Baseball second basemen
Major League Baseball third basemen
Baseball players from Virginia
Tacoma Rainiers players
Minor league baseball managers
Sportspeople from Petersburg, Virginia
African-American baseball managers
Asheville Tourists players
Burlington Rangers players
Gulf Coast Rangers players
Oklahoma City 89ers players
Omaha Royals players
American expatriate baseball players in Canada
Ottawa Lynx players
Tulsa Drillers players
21st-century African-American people
20th-century African-American sportspeople